Oxbow Estates is a census-designated place (CDP) in Gila County, Arizona, United States. The population was 217 at the 2010 census.

Geography
It is drained to the west by the seasonally flowing St. Johns Creek, a tributary of Rye Creek and part of the Tonto Creek watershed.

Demographics

References

Census-designated places in Gila County, Arizona